Penny McCarthy is a New Zealand swimmer. She won the silver medal in the women's 100 metres butterfly representing her country at the 1978 Commonwealth Games in Edmonton, recording a time of 1:02.27, and finishing 0.35 s behind the winner, Wendy Quirk from Canada.  She also competed in the 200 metres butterfly at those games, but finished ninth in the heats and did not progress further.

At the 1978 World Swimming Championships in West Berlin, McCarthy finished 12th in the women's 100 metres butterfly. The following year, at the 1978 Australian national swimming championships in Perth, she was second in the women's 100 metres butterfly, behind fellow New Zealander Rebecca Perrott.

See also
 List of Commonwealth Games medallists in swimming (women)

References

Year of birth missing (living people)
Living people
New Zealand female swimmers
Commonwealth Games silver medallists for New Zealand
New Zealand female butterfly swimmers
Swimmers at the 1978 Commonwealth Games
Commonwealth Games medallists in swimming
Medallists at the 1978 Commonwealth Games